William of Saint Omer was a French knight, descended from a Fauquembergues family who were castellans of the eponymous castle of Saint-Omer. 

His father, Nicholas I of Saint Omer, received lands in Boeotia in the aftermath of the Fourth Crusade. He later married Margaret of Hungary, the widow of Boniface of Montferrat, Lord of Thessalonica (died 1207). It is unclear when the marriage took place: traditional accounts mention that Nicholas died already in 1212 or 1214, but F. Van Tricht dates the marriage to after 1217. 

William was the younger son of the couple, he had an elder brother Bela of Saint Omer. While Bela received one half of Thebes as dowry from his marriage, William and his mother moved to the Kingdom of Hungary, where Béla IV was the King, also a grandson of Béla III, like William. Following his mother's death sometime after 1223, William inherited her estates in Syrmia and Macsó. He participated in the Battle of Mohi, following this he belonged to the companion of Béla IV who had fled to Dalmatia, escaping before the Mongols. William was ispán of Kraszna County in 1241. From 1241 until his death, he served as Master of the Horse. 

Béla IV betrothed William to his second eldest daughter Margaret (not to be confused with Saint Margaret of Hungary), however both persons died by 1242. According to his epitaph at the Cathedral of Saint Domnius, William died in April 1242 in Trogir, where the royal family resided until the Mongol occupation.

References

Sources
 
 
 
 
 

1242 deaths
Year of birth unknown
French expatriates in Hungary
Saint-Omer family
13th-century Hungarian people
Masters of the horse (Kingdom of Hungary)